Rag Union is a 2015 Russian teen comedy film directed by Mikhail Mestetsky.

The film was screened at the Berlinale in the Generation 14plus section.

In 2017, HBO purchased the rights to show the film on the HBO Central Europe channel.

Plot
An ordinary Moscow guy, Vanya, after finishing school, goes to work as a "living advertisement" of monument-tombstones. At the cemetery, he meets three energetic guys - either a section, or a sect that calls itself the "Rag Union". Vanya asks to take him to their training sessions, and they settle for a month at Vanya's dacha.

Cast
 Vasily Butkevich as Vanya
 Aleksandr Pal as Popov
 Ivan Yankovsky as Andrey
 Pavel Chinaryov as Pyotr
 Andrey Kryzhniy as Leader
 Anastasia Pronina as Sasha

Awards
The film's acting ensemble received the award for Best Actor at the Kinotavr, which occurred for the first time in the festival's history.

References

External links 

2010s teen comedy films
Russian teen comedy films
2015 comedy films